LS Canis Majoris is an eclipsing binary star located around 1,510 light years from Earth in the constellation Canis Major. Its apparent magnitude ranges from 5.63 to 5.79. The orbital period of binary pair and the period of light variation is 70.048 days.

References

Canis Major
Eclipsing binaries
B-type giants
B-type subgiants
Canis Majoris, LS
052670
2640
033804
CD-25 03911